Hi-Vis High Tea is the ninth studio album by Australian punk band Frenzal Rhomb. It was recorded in Colorado, USA, with Bill Stevenson as producer and was released in May 2017. It was nominated at the 2017 ARIA Music Awards for Best Hard Rock/Heavy Metal Album, but lost to Northlane's Mesmer.

The album is the first since a series of medical mishaps befall the band, delaying recording and release. Vocalist Jay Whalley underwent brain surgery in 2013 in order to have a parasitic tapeworm removed, as documented in the song Pigworm, drummer Gordy Forman suffered a 2015 broken arm following a stage dive attempt during a Perth concert, and guitarist Lindsay McDougall was forced to undergo emergency eye surgery in the same year.

Track listing

Charts

References

2017 albums
Frenzal Rhomb albums
Albums produced by Bill Stevenson (musician)
Fat Wreck Chords albums
Shock Records albums